The San Pedro Sula Honduras Temple is a temple of the Church of Jesus Christ of Latter-day Saints under construction in San Pedro Sula, Honduras.

History
The intent to construct the temple was announced by church president Russell M. Nelson on April 7, 2019. The San Pedro Sula Honduras Temple was announced concurrently with 7 other temples. At the time, the number of operating or announced temples was 162.

On 5 September 2020, a groundbreaking to signify beginning of construction was held, with Elder José Bernardo Hernandez Orellana, an area seventy, presiding.  This will be the second temple in Honduras.

See also

 The Church of Jesus Christ of Latter-day Saints in Honduras
 Comparison of temples of The Church of Jesus Christ of Latter-day Saints
 List of temples of The Church of Jesus Christ of Latter-day Saints
 List of temples of The Church of Jesus Christ of Latter-day Saints by geographic region
 Temple architecture (Latter-day Saints)

References

External links
San Pedro Sula Honduras Temple Official announcement
San Pedro Sula Honduras Temple at ChurchofJesusChristTemples.org

Proposed religious buildings and structures of the Church of Jesus Christ of Latter-day Saints
The Church of Jesus Christ of Latter-day Saints in Honduras
Religious buildings and structures in Honduras
21st-century Latter Day Saint temples
Buildings and structures in San Pedro Sula
Proposed buildings and structures in Honduras